Magnetic pulse welding (MPW) is a solid state welding process that uses magnetic forces to weld two workpieces together. The welding mechanism is most similar to that of explosion welding.
Magnetic pulse welding started in the early 1970s, when the automotive industry began to use solid state welding. The biggest advantage using magnetic pulse welding is that the formation of brittle intermetallic phases is avoided. Therefore, dissimilar metals can be welded, which cannot be effectively joined by fusion welding. With magnetic pulse welding high quality welds in similar and dissimilar metals can be made in microseconds without the need for shielding gases or welding consumables.

Process

Magnetic pulse welding is based on a very short electromagnetic pulse (<100 µs), which is obtained by a fast discharge of capacitors through low inductance switches into a coil. The pulsed current with a very high amplitude and frequency (500 kA and 15 kHz) produces a high-density magnetic field, which creates an eddy current in one of the work pieces.

During magnetic pulse welding a high plastic deformation is developed along with high shear strain and oxide disruption thanks to the jet and high temperatures near the collision zone. This leads to solid state weld due to the microstructure refinement, dislocation cells, slip bends, micro twins and local recrystallization.

Principles
In order to get a strong weld, several conditions have to be reached:
Jetting condition: the collision has to be subsonic compared to the local material's speed of sound to generate a jet.
High pressure regime: the impact velocity has to be sufficient to obtain a hydrodynamic regime, otherwise the parts will only be crimped or formed.
No fusion during the collision: If the pressure is too high, the materials can locally melt and re-solidify. This can cause a weak weld.

The main difference between magnetic pulse welding and explosive welding is that the collision angle and the velocity are almost constant during the explosive welding process, while in magnetic pulse welding they continuously vary.

Advantages of MPW
 Allows welding of designs which with other processes are challenging or not possible.
 High-speed pulse lasts from 10 to 100 µs, the only time limitation is loading and unloading and capacitor charge time.
 Lower down-time due to lack of consumable parts (e.g. electrodes) and no need for cleaning.
 Suited to mass-production: typically 1-5 million welds per year.
 Dissimilar metals welding is possible.
 Weld with no heat-affected zone.
 No need for filler materials.
 Green process: no smoke, no radiation and no extraction equipment required.
 Bulk and surface purity is preserved.
 Can produce welds with no shielding gas, can be used to seal parts under vacuum.
 Mechanical strength of the joint is stronger than that of the parent material.
 High precision obtainable by adjustment of magnetic field, weld parameters can be changed electronically.
 Zero distortion can be achieved depending on part materials & geometry.
 Almost zero residual stresses.
 No corrosion development in the welding area.

Disadvantages 

 Challenging to apply to welds that are not roughly circular.
 Geometry of parts may have to be changed to allow the magnetic pulse process.
 If the parts cannot be slid into and out of the pulse coil a more complex multi-part coil must be designed.
 Pulse coil may have to be re-designed if materials or dimensions are changed.
 Brittle components can be fractured by the shock (does not exclude the use of materials like glass, but must be considered).
 May produce an EMP effect on any electronics present inside or near the part.
 Initial investment cost may outweigh the lower price-per-weld for low volume parts.

Numerical simulations of MPW
Various numerical investigations were carried out to predict the interface behavior of the MPW and the in-flight behavior of the flyer to determine the collision conditions. Generally, the flyer velocity prior to the impact governs the interfacial phenomena. This is the characteristic parameter that should be known based on the process and adjustable process parameters. Although, Experimental measurements using laser velocimetry methods provide an accurate assessment of the flyer velocity, (one example of such measurement is Photon Doppler velocimetry (PDV)), numerical computation offers a better description of the flyer velocity in terms of spatial and temporal distribution. Moreover, a multi-physics computation of the MPW process take into account of the electrical current through the coil and compute the physical behavior for an electromagnetic-mechanical coupled problem. Sometime, these simulations also allow to include the thermal effect during the process. The model is used to show the capability of 3D computation to predict the process behavior and particularly, the flyer kinematics and macroscopic deformation.

References

External links
The Electromagnetic Pulse Technology (EMPT): Forming, Welding, Crimping and Cutting by R. Schäfer, P. A. Pasquale and S. W. Kallee
3D Impacts Modeling of the Magnetic Pulse Welding Process and Comparison to Experimental Data by J.-P. Cuq-Lelandais*, G. Avrillaud, S. Ferreira, G. Mazars, A. Nottebaert, G. Teilla, V. Shribman
Automotive Applications of Electromagnetic Pulse Technology (EMPT) by S. W. Kallee, R. Schäfer and P. A. Pasquale.
Special Issue "Impulse-Based Manufacturing Technologies" by Verena Psyk et al, J. Manuf. Mater. Process. 2021, 5(3), 96, ISSN 2504-4494.

Welding